Thomas McKevitt (born April 28, 1971) is an American politician who represented District 17 in the New York Assembly from 2006 to 2017, which includes large portions of Nassau County, New York.

McKevitt was born in East Meadow, New York and is a lifetime resident of Nassau County. He received a B.A from Hofstra University, where he graduated summa cum laude in 1993. McKevitt earned his Juris Doctor from the Hofstra Law School in 1996. He is a member of the New York State Bar Association and the American Bar Association.

Formerly the Deputy Attorney for Hempstead, New York, as well as a staffer for former Senator Alfonse D'Amato and State Senator Kemp Hannon, McKevitt was chosen in a special election held on February 28, 2006 to replace outgoing Assemblywoman Maureen O'Connell, who is now the Nassau County Clerk.

McKevitt and Samantha McGill were married in July 2001. He and his wife reside in East Meadow, New York with their two children.

Election results
 February 2006 special election, NYS Assembly, 17th AD
{| class="Wikitable"
| Thomas McKevitt (REP - IND - CON) || ... || 3,561
|-
| Zahid Ali Syed (DEM - WOR) || ... || 1,691
|}

 November 2006 general election, NYS Assembly, 17th AD
{| class="Wikitable"
| Thomas McKevitt (REP - IND - CON) || ... || 19,048
|-
| Dolores D. Sedacca (DEM - WOR) || ... || 16,622
|}

 November 2008 general election, NYS Assembly, 17th AD
{| class="Wikitable"
| Thomas McKevitt (REP - IND - CON) || ... || 31,803
|-
| John L. Pinto (DEM) || ... || 23,321
|}

 November 2010 general election, NYS Assembly, 17th AD
{| class="Wikitable"
| Thomas McKevitt (REP - IND - CON) || ... || 24,766
|-
| Thomas J. Devaney (DEM - WOR) || ... || 15,060
|}

References

External links
New York State Assembly Member Website
McKevitt and Zahid Vie for 17th Assembly Seat
Civil Rights Actions and Zoning Decisions

Living people
1971 births
Republican Party members of the New York State Assembly
Hofstra University alumni
Maurice A. Deane School of Law alumni
People from Oceanside, New York
People from East Meadow, New York
21st-century American politicians
County legislators in New York (state)